The Cologne Mani-Codex (Codex Manichaicus Coloniensis) is a minute parchment codex, dated on paleographical evidence to the fifth century CE, found near Asyut (the ancient Lycopolis), Egypt; it contains a Greek text describing the life of Mani, the founder of the religion Manichaeism.

The codex became known via antique dealers in Cairo. It consisted of four deteriorated lumps of vellum the size of a palm, and was in very poor condition. Many emendations and alternate readings were offered in the following decade, and it was found that some of the minute fragments associated with the codex could be successfully incorporated into the body of text. A second edition was published in 1988. Two symposia have been devoted to the codex, and their papers published: in Rende (Calabria) (1984) and in Cosenza (1988).

The text, which bears the ambiguous title "On the origin of his body", recounts Mani's introduction to the Jewish-Christian Elkesaite baptising sect. Mani's teachings are revealed to him through his spiritual companion and celestial twin (his syzygos). The Greek text bears traces that demonstrate it had been translated from an Eastern Aramaic or Old Syriac original. The logoi of Mani himself are repeatedly cited. That it is a compilation from earlier texts is suggested by the names, apparently of teachers that head each section of the text.

Notes

University of Cologne, Papyrus Collection

References
The Cologne Mani Codex (P. Colon. inv. nr. 4780) "Concerning the Origin of His Body". Edited and translated by Ron Cameron and Arthur J. Dewey. Society of Biblical Literature Texts and Translations Series 15. Missoula, MT: Scholars Press, 1979.University of Cologne, Papyrus Collection
 Der Kölner Mani-Kodex (in German),University of Cologne, Papyrus Collection

External links
Encyclopædia Iranica, s.v. "Cologne Mani-Codex"

5th-century books
5th-century manuscripts
Elcesaites
Manichaean texts
Texts in Koine Greek
Texts in Syriac